Timothy Daniel Gray Warrillow (born 1974/1975) is a British businessman, and co-founder and CEO of the drinks brand Fever-Tree.

Early life
Warrillow was born in London, England. He earned a bachelor's degree in business management from Newcastle University.

Career
Warrillow early career was as an advertising executive. In 2003, he co-founded Fever-Tree with Charles Rolls. They first met in a pub close to London's Sloane Square.

Personal life
Warrillow lives in London, England.

References

Living people
British company founders
1970s births
British chief executives